Urgewald is a group that researches coal companies, because they are among the top contributors to greenhouse gas emissions and so cause climate change. The Global Coal Exit List, which they publish, is famous.

Urgewald provided analysis to underpin a Guardian newspaper exposé on the "scores of vast projects" that the oil and gas majors are planning .  If only a fraction of these projects proceed to exploitation, the consequences for the global climate will still be huge.

See also
 Global Energy Monitor

External links 
 List of coal companies

References 

Non-governmental organizations
Coal
Environmental organizations established in 1992